William E. Miller (born September 14, 1949) is an American ordained minister, former standup comedian, keynote speaker, teacher and full-time therapist. He was best known for being Nick at Nite's resident television therapist and the host of their "Why We Watch" segments starting in 1992.

Education
He is a 1971 graduate of Providence College. He has a masters and doctorate from the University of Massachusetts Amherst.

References

External links
Official website

1949 births
Living people
American male comedians
21st-century American comedians